Leptogyra inflata is a species of sea snail, a marine gastropod mollusk in the family Melanodrymiidae.

Description
The length of the shell attains 1.32 mm.

Distribution
This marine species occurs off the Fiji Islands.

References

 Warén A. & Bouchet P. (1993) New records, species, genera, and a new family of gastropods from hydrothermal vents and hydrocarbon seeps. Zoologica Scripta 22: 1-90.

Melanodrymiidae
Gastropods described in 1897